Francis Cope Evans (2 December 1914, Philadelphia – 16 August 2002, Ann Arbor) was an American ecologist and professor of zoology. He was the president of the Ecological Society of America from 1983 to 1984.

Biography
After secondary education at Germantown Friends School, Evans matriculated at Haverford College and graduated there in 1936 with a bachelor's degree in biology. With a Rhodes Scholarship he was a graduate student in zoology at Oriel College, Oxford, from 1936 to 1939, when he graduated with a Ph.D. supervised by Charles Sutherland Elton. Evans's dissertation, published in 1942 in The Journal of Animal Ecology, dealt with small mammal ecology in Bagley Wood. In 1939 he became a Claypole Memorial Fellow at the University of California, Berkeley, where he worked as a research assistant to the epidemiologist Karl Friedrich Meyer. Evans did fieldwork in California and the Pacific Northwest to study the "relationships of vertebrates, ectoparasites, and disease."

In 1942 Evans moved to the University of California, Davis to become an assistant zoologist supervised by  Tracy I. Storer at the Agricultural Experiment Station. In 1943 the University of California closed the Davis campus so that the U.S. Army Signal Corps could use it for the duration of WW II. In that year he became an instructor in biology at Haverford College, where he trained medical personnel for the U.S. war effort. In 1948 he left Haverford to become an assistant biologist in the Laboratory of Vertebrate Biology directed by Lee R. Dice, as well an assistant professor of zoology at the University of Michigan at Ann Arbor. There Evans was promoted to full professor in 1959 and retired as professor emeritus in 1982.

He was a Guggenheim Fellow for the academic year 1961–1962 and was elected a Fellow of the American Association for the Advancement of Science in 1963.

Evans married Rachel Worthington Brooks (1915–2002) in June 1942. Upon his death he was survived by his widow, four children, and five grandchildren.

Evans Old Field
From 1948 to 1997 Evans studied community ecology in successional changes in a 7.7 ha old field at the Edwin S. George Reserve in Livingston County, Michigan. This study area came to be known as the "Evans Old Field" and is one of the world's most intensively studied old fields. Evans studied the area's bee fauna (134 species) and their visits to 57 different species of flowering plants.

Selected publications

References

1914 births
2002 deaths
20th-century American zoologists
American ecologists
Germantown Friends School alumni
Haverford College alumni
Alumni of Oriel College, Oxford
Haverford College faculty
University of Michigan faculty
People from Philadelphia